Harold Arthur Edward Shillinglaw (2 December 1927 – 15 April 2016) was an Australian rules footballer who played for Fitzroy in the Victorian Football League (VFL).

Shillinglaw was brought up in Fitzroy and made his debut for their football club in the 1945 VFL season. The Collingwood Tech recruit ended up playing 63 games over seven seasons with Fitzroy.

He also had a brief first-class cricket career, playing three matches for Victoria between 1949–50 and 1953–54, taking 8 wickets at 20.25 with his right-arm medium pace bowling and scoring 88 runs at 17.60.

Shillinglaw played 157 first eleven games of Melbourne District Cricket for Fitzroy Cricket Club between 1943 and 1960.

Shillinglaw also played for Fitzroy in the Melbourne Major Baseball LEague in 1956. On 16 June 1956 he was noted to hit a home run in a tied game against Prahan.

Links
 
 List of Victoria first-class cricketers
 Cricinfo profile

References

1927 births
2016 deaths
Australian cricketers
Fitzroy Football Club players
People from Fitzroy, Victoria
Victoria cricketers
Australian rules footballers from Melbourne
Cricketers from Melbourne